Wānaka is a summer resort town in New Zealand.

Wanaka or Wanakah may also refer to:

 Wanakah, New York, a hamlet of New York state
 Wanaka, Mycenaean Greek for Anax
 Lake Wānaka, New Zealand